Roberto Maytín and Hans Podlipnik-Castillo are the defending champions, but Maytín has partnered with Miguel Ángel Reyes-Varela and Podlipnik-Castillo has chosen not to participate . Roberto Maytín and Miguel Ángel Reyes-Varela are defeated by Ariel Behar and Giovanni Lapentti in the quarterfinals . 

Ariel Behar and Giovanni Lapentti went on to win the title, defeating Jonathan Eysseric and Franko Škugor in the final 7–5, 6–4 .

Seeds

Draw

References
Main Draw

2016 ATP Challenger Tour
2016 Doubles